Robert Styles (born 21 April 1964) is an English football Referee from Waterlooville, Hampshire, who officiated in the FA Premier League, and for FIFA. He retired in 2009.

Career 

Styles began refereeing in 1987, officiating in the Wessex League and then the Isthmian League before being appointed to the National List of referees in 1996. The year 2000 was a busy one for Styles. He handled a Football League First Division play-off semi-final, and a Second Division play-off semi-final, plus the Second Division play-off final itself, between Wigan Athletic and Gillingham at Wembley, which ended 2–3 after extra time. He was also fourth official for both the Football League Trophy final of that year between Stoke City and Bristol City, and the 2000 FA Trophy Final, when Kingstonian beat Kettering Town 3–2.

His promotion to the Premier League list also happened in the year 2000, and his first match in the top group was the 1–0 win by Leicester City at West Ham United on 23 August 2000, Darren Eadie scoring the goal. He became a FIFA referee in 2002.

He was referee for the 2003 FA Youth Cup Final when Manchester United beat Middlesbrough 3–1. However, his highest honour was his selection as referee for the 2005 FA Cup Final at the Millennium Stadium, Cardiff, between Arsenal and Manchester United, which the Gunners won 5–4 on penalties after a 0–0 draw following extra time.

In August 2007 Styles refereed the Premier League game between Liverpool and Chelsea where he wrongly awarded a penalty to Chelsea and then caused confusion by showing two yellow cards for a single incident. As a result of his decision to award the penalty and the confusion regarding the yellow cards, it was announced by Keith Hackett, general manager of Professional Game Match Officials Limited (PGMOL), that Styles would be "dropped" for one round of matches.

Styles last game the West Bromwich Albion and Manchester United match in January 2009. He sent off West Brom defender Paul Robinson five minutes before half time. In the following days the red card was overturned by the F.A. Two days after the overturning Styles retired from refereeing, citing the lack of support from the FA as his main reason.

Career statistics

References

External links 
 Rob Styles Referee Statistics at soccerbase.com
 Rob Styles 2005 FA Cup Final interview at the Football Association
 Retrospective feature on his 2005 FA Cup Final performance, by Guardian Unlimited online

English football referees
Premier League referees
1964 births
Living people
People from Waterlooville
FA Cup Final referees